Mary Louise Wilson (born November 12, 1931) is an American actress, singer, and comedian.

In a career that has spanned more than 50 years, she has appeared in a number of plays, films and television shows. Wilson's most notable work includes a Tony Award-winning role on Broadway in Grey Gardens. She is also known for her appearances on One Day at a Time.

Early life 
Wilson was born in New Haven, Connecticut, but raised in New Orleans, Louisiana.  She married fellow actor Alfred “Chibbie” Cibelli on April 6, 1965 in New Haven. They were married for three years before the union ended in divorce.

Work

Stage

Broadway
 Hot Spot (1963) as Sue Ann (Broadway debut)
 Flora, The Red Menace (1965) as Comrade Ada
 Lovers and Other Strangers (1968) as Bernice
 Noël Coward's Sweet Potato (1968) (replacement)
 Promises, Promises (1968) as Marge MacDougall
 Watercolor & Criss-Crossing (1970)
 The Women (1973) as Nancy Blake
 Gypsy: A Musical Fable (1974) as Tessie Tura
 The Royal Family (1975) as Kitty Dean
 The Importance of Being Earnest (1977) as Miss Prism
 The Philadelphia Story (1980) as Elizabeth Imbrie
 Fools (1981) as Lenya Zubritsky
 Alice in Wonderland (1982) as the Red Queen
 The Odd Couple (1985) as Mickey
 Cabaret (1998) as Fräulein Schneider
 The Women (2001) as Mrs. Morehead
 Grey Gardens (2006) as Edith Bouvier Beale (Tony Award)
 On the Twentieth Century (2015) as Letita Peabody Primrose

Off-Broadway
 Bonds of Interest (1958)
 The Threepenny Opera (1959) (replacement)
 Dime a Dozen (1962)
 A Great Career (1968)
 Whispers on the Wind (1970)
 Sister Mary Ignatius Explains It All for You and The Actor's Nightmare (1982) (replacement)
 Baby with the Bathwater (1983)
 Macbeth (1989)
 Flaubert's Latest (1992)
 Full Gallop (1995) (co-author, winner of the Drama Desk Award for Outstanding One-Person Show)
 Bosoms and Neglect (1998)
 The Beard of Avon (2004)
 Grey Gardens (2006)
 4000 Miles (2011)

Other
 Gypsy (1974)
 Anyone Can Whistle (1980)
 Social Security (1987)
 False Admissions (1994)
 The Milk Train Doesn't Stop Here Anymore (1996)
 Morning's at Seven (2002)
 The Rivals (2005)
 The Guardsman (2010)

Filmography

Television
 The Royal Family (1977) as Kitty Dean
 One Day at a Time (1976-1977) as Ginny Wroblicki
 Maude (1978) as Congresswoman Irene McIlhenny
 Lou Grant (1982)
 A Mistaken Charity (1986) as Mrs. Simmonds
 Tales from the Darkside (1986)
 The Thorns (1988)
 Blind Spot (1993) as Mrs. Deitz
 Remember WENN (1996)
 Cosby (1999)
 Frasier (2000) as Helen
 The Sopranos (2000) as Catherine Romano
 A Season for Miracles (1999) as Corinna
 The Women (2002) as Mrs. Morehead
 Louie (2010) as Louie's mother 
 Nurse Jackie (2012) as Doris
 Mozart in the Jungle (2014-2018) as Bunny 
 Orange is the New Black (2016) as Millie
 Modern Family (2018) as Becky Pritchett

Awards and nominations

References

External links
 
 
 
 Grey Gardens, "Working in the Theatre" video from the American Theatre Wing (November 2006)

1931 births
Living people
American film actresses
American musical theatre actresses
American stage actresses
American television actresses
Actresses from New Orleans
Tony Award winners
Actresses from New Haven, Connecticut
20th-century American actresses
21st-century American actresses
Drama Desk Award winners